Here is a list of mergers in Nara Prefecture, Japan since the Heisei era.

Mergers from April 1, 1999 to Present
On October 1, 2004 - the towns of Shinjō and Taima (both from Kitakatsuragi District) were merged to create the city of Katsuragi.
On April 1, 2005 - the village of Tsuge (from Yamabe District), and the village of Tsukigase (from Soekami District) were merged into the expanded city of Nara. Soekami District was dissolved as a result of this merger.
On September 25, 2005 - the villages of Nishiyoshino and Ōtō (both from Yoshino District) were merged into the expanded city of Gojō.
On January 1, 2006 - the towns of Haibara, Ōuda and Utano, and the village of Murō (all from Uda District) were merged to create the city of Uda.

Planned/Future Mergers

 
Nara